Live @ Divan Orange 2007-10-21 is a live album by the Montreal-based instrumental shoegaze band Destroyalldreamers which was released as a free internet download in 2009. It was recorded on October 21, 2007, at Divan Orange, a popular Montreal independent music venue. The performance was in support of their previous album Wish I Was All Flames, which was released in the same week.

Track listing
The album includes material from their most recent LP, as mentioned earlier, as well as from their first album À Coeur Léger Sommeil Sanglant.

Personnel

Destroyalldreamers
 Eric Quach - guitar, mastering
 Mathieu Grisé - guitar
 Maxime Racicot - bass guitar
 Shaun Doré - drums

Production
 Emmanuel Tremblay - recording
 Meryem Yildiz - photography

References

External links
Album Page at Last.fm
Divan Orange
Meryem Yildiz's Website Displaying Part of the Artwork for the Album

Destroyalldreamers albums
2009 live albums